Malicious falsehood or injurious falsehood is a tort. It is a lie that was uttered with malice, that is, the utterer knew it was false or would cause damage or harm.

Malicious falsehood is a false statement made maliciously that causes damage to the claimant. Malicious in this case means the defendant either knew the statement was not true or did not take proper care to check. It is often covered under laws regarding defamation.

England and Wales

Proof of special damage
Section 3(1) of the Defamation Act 1952 reads:

This implements a recommendation of the Porter Committee

For the purposes of section 3 of the Defamation Act 1952, the publication of words (including pictures, visual images, gestures and other methods of signifying meaning) in the course of a performance of a play is, subject to section 7 of the Theatres Act 1968, treated as publication in permanent form.

Limitation
See section 4A(b) of the Limitation Act 1980.

Northern Ireland
See section 3 of the Defamation Act (Northern Ireland) 1955.

See also
Verbal injury

References

Malicious Falsehoods

Further reading
 Ajinomoto Sweeteners Europe SAS v Asda Stores Ltd [2009 EWHC 1717 (QB), a UK decision relating to malicious falsehood

Defamation